Latanoprost/timolol (trade name Xalacom) is a combination drug used in glaucoma, consisting of latanoprost (increase uveoscleral outflow of aqueous humor) and timolol (a beta blocker decreasing the production of aqueous fluid).

References

Ophthalmology drugs
Combination drugs